Moods...Moments is the debut studio album by American singer Monifah. It was released by Uptown Records on March 26, 1996 in the United States. The album was mostly produced by Heavy D, with additional production by Poke & Tone, Kip Collins, Vincent Herbert, Rheji Burrell, and Spaceman Patterson. Upon release, the album earned positive reviews and reached number 42 on the US Billboard 200 and number 6 on the Top R&B/Hip-Hop Albums.

Three charting singles were released from the album, including "I Miss You (Come Back Home)",  "You", and "You Don't Have to Love Me". Lead single "I Miss You (Come Back Home)" was certified Gold, as was the second single "You" which peaked at number 32 on the Billboard Hot 100. The track "Nobody's Body" was featured on the soundtrack to the comedy film To Wong Foo, Thanks For Everything! Julie Newmar (1995).

Critical reception

In his review for AllMusic, editor Leo Stanley found that "Monifah's rich voice is the first thing you notice on her debut album, Moods...Moments, and it's the thing that keeps the album afloat through its occasional dull spots [...] For the most part, producer Heavy D provides her with enough first-rate songs to make sure that we not only notice the gift, but that we don't forget it once the album is through, either. [His] songs are varied and soulful, giving her a proper showcase for her prodigous talents. Moods...Moments does have a handful of weak songs and could have benefitted from some trimming, but that doesn't prevent the album from being a simply stellar debut."

Track listing

Notes
 signifies co-producer
Sample credits
"You" Contains elements from "Make the Music with Your Mouth, Biz" as performed by Biz Markie.
"Don't Waste My Time" contains elements from "Superman Lover" as performed by Johnny "Guitar" Watson.
"Everything You Do" contains elements from "Someone Who Will Take the Place of You" as performed by Isaac Hayes. 
"I Miss You (Come Back Home) (Remix)" contains elements from "Slippin' into Darkness" as by performed by War.

Charts

Weekly charts

Year-end charts

References

1996 debut albums
Monifah albums
Uptown Records albums